The Clarkson House is an 1818 building in Lewiston, New York that has been in use as a restaurant since 1958.

History
The Clarkson House building was "one of the first buildings constructed after the burning of the Village of Lewiston by the British during the War of 1812. It was built in 1818 by Jacob Townsend who came to Lewiston from Connecticut in 1810".

Restaurant
Robert and Marilyn Clarkson established the Clarkson House restaurant in the building in 1958, operating it as their family business until 1995. The intimate steak and lobster restaurant was "a favorite stop for travelers and visitors to Lewiston"  from both sides of the border, and has been repeatedly featured in "Country Inns and Back Roads" travel guides.

Following the Clarksons' retirement, the restaurant continued operating under the Clarkson House name until August 2009, new tenant Gary Macri reopened the restaurant under the name Macri's Italian Grille, his family business of over 60 years.

In 2017, the building was leased by the Griffon Gastropub, and they reopened the restaurant as the Griffon House.

References 

Houses completed in 1818
Restaurants in New York (state)
Houses in Niagara County, New York
Restaurants established in 1958
1958 establishments in New York (state)